Aglaia leucophylla is a species of plant in the family Meliaceae. It is found in Brunei, Indonesia, Malaysia, the Philippines, and Thailand.

References

leucophylla
Near threatened plants
Taxonomy articles created by Polbot